Seia is a municipality in Guarda District in Portugal. Its urban population is about 7,000. Seia was elevated to city status on July 3, 1986. The municipality is situated on the northwestern slope of Serra da Estrela, the highest mountain range in mainland Portugal, with a top height of 1993 meters. The present Mayor is António Luciano Silva Ribeiro, elected by the Socialist Party. The municipal holiday is July 3. Seia has an annual cinema festival called CineEco that focuses on films with ecological and natural themes.

Geography
The municipality is limited to the north by the municipalities of Nelas and Mangualde, to the northeast by Gouveia, to the east by Manteigas, to the southeast by Covilhã, to the southwest by Arganil and to the west by Oliveira do Hospital. In this municipality is located the highest point in mainland Portugal, Torre, in Serra da Estrela, with 1,993 meters of altitude. The municipality of Seia covers a large part of Serra da Estrela and is also the only one in Portugal where there is a natural ski resort, Vodafone Ski Resort, located within the limits of the parish of Loriga.

Located on the western slope of Serra da Estrela, the city of Seia is at an altitude of 550 m. The climate of the municipality is temperate, with moderate temperatures in summer and cold in winter, with very low temperatures and occurrences of snow, sometimes abundant, in the highest parts of Serra da Estrela. As for the rainfall regime, there is a short dry season, which comprises the summer months of July and August.

It is 98 km from Coimbra, 67 km from Guarda, 45 km from Viseu, 298 km from Lisbon and 163 km from Porto. It is mainly served by the Nacional 17 and Nacional 231, which allow a connection to the A25, A24 and IP3.

The Lagoa Comprida dam, built from a natural lagoon, is the main water reservoir in Serra da Estrela. It is the largest of the lakes in the upper massif and its high hydroelectric potential led to the construction of the dam in 1911, being one of the first engineering works of this nature carried out in Portugal.

History
The primitive human presence on where Seia lies today dates back to pre-Roman times, when a settlement was founded by the Turduli, around the 4th century BC, under the name Senna. The Turduli built a castro in the place of Nogueira, between the hills of Santana and Carvalha do Outeiro. Three smaller castros strategically defended it, one in São Romão, another in Crestelo and a third in what is now Seia. There are still remains of castros in Travancinha, Loriga and São Romão.

When the Roman invasion of the Iberian Peninsula took place, the Lusitanians made the mountain range, then called Montes Hermínios, their headquarters, which became a strong hurdle for the invaders. This did not, however, prevent General Galba from massacring 30,000 Lusitanian mountaineers.

When the Romans became lords of the land, they then transformed the Iberian castro of Nogueira into the Roman "Civitas Sena", which was fortified when it became an Ópido with the same name. It was later occupied by the Visigoths and the Moors, the latter from the 8th century onwards.

At the time of the Christian Reconquest of the Iberian Peninsula, the town was definitively conquered from the Moors by Fernando Magno, who rebuilt its fortification. About this episode, the chronicle of monk Silas recounts the violence of the attack and how the Christians put the occupants of Ópido Sena into flight, towards Ópido Visense (now Viseu).

During the time of formation of the Portuguese nationality, Bermudo Peres, Teresa of León's brother-in-law, started a revolt in the castle of Seia. He was unsuccessful, as Afonso I, having learned of this, went to meet him with his forces and expelled him from the castle. In the following year, he donated the domains of Seia and its castle to his servant João Viegas in recognition of services rendered. A few years later, the sovereign granted the first charter to the village in 1136, designating it Civitatem Senam.

Other charters followed, such as the one granted by Afonso II, in December 1217, that of Duarte of Portugal, in December 1433, that of Afonso V, in August 1479, and, finally, that of Manuel I, on June 1st 1510.

It was in Seia that the last republican rally was held before the establishment of the Portuguese Republic in 1910. This rally took place on the 25th of September and was chaired by Afonso Costa, a local of Seia.

Population

Parishes

Administratively, the municipality is divided into 21 civil parishes (freguesias):

 Alvoco da Serra
 Carragozela e Várzea de Meruge
 Girabolhos
 Loriga 
 Paranhos 
 Pinhanços
 Sabugueiro
 Sameice e Santa Eulália
 Sandomil
 Santa Comba
 Santa Marinha e São Martinho
 Santiago 
 Sazes da Beira
 Seia, São Romão e Lapa dos Dinheiros
 Teixeira
 Torrozelo e Folhadosa
 Tourais e Lajes
 Travancinha
 Valezim
 Vide e Cabeça
 Vila Cova à Coelheira

Notable people 
 Sebastião Fernandes da Costa (1842 in Santa Marinha – 1889) a lawyer and politician.
 Afonso Augusto da Costa (1871-1937) a lawyer, professor and republican politician.
 Theodorico de Sacadura Botte (1902 in Quinta da Bica - 1987) a colonial administrator and entrepreneur.
 António de Almeida Santos (1926–2016) a lawyer, politician and government minister
 Joaquim Pina Moura (1952 in Loriga – 2020) a Portuguese politician and economist.

Sport 
 Fernando Mendes (born 1937) a footballer and manager with 177 club caps and 21 for Portugal.
 André Lopes (born 1982) a Portuguese volleyball player 
 José Bosingwa (born 1982) a former footballer with 334 club caps and 27 with Portugal.
 Cícero Semedo (born 1986) a footballer with over 260 club caps and 14 for Guinea-Bissau
 Alexandre Ferreira (born 1991) a Portuguese volleyball player

References

External links
Municipality official website

Seia